Empagliflozin, sold under the brand name Jardiance among others, is an antidiabetic medication used to improve glucose control in people with type2 diabetes. It is not recommended for type 1 diabetes. It is taken by mouth.

Common side effects include hyperventilation, anorexia, abdominal pain, nausea, vomiting, lethargy, mental status changes, hypotension, acute kidney injury, and vaginal yeast infections. Rarer but more serious side effects include a skin infection of the groin called Fournier's gangrene and a form of diabetic ketoacidosis with normal blood sugar levels. Use in pregnancy and breastfeeding is not recommended. Use is not recommended in those with significant kidney disease, though it may help slow the progression of mild kidney problems. Empagliflozin is an inhibitor of the sodium glucose co-transporter-2 (SGLT-2), and works by increasing sugar lost in the urine.

Empagliflozin was approved for medical use in the United States and in the European Union in 2014. It is on the World Health Organization's List of Essential Medicines. In 2020, it was the 102nd most commonly prescribed medication in the United States, with more than 6million prescriptions. It has received approval as a generic medication from the US Food and Drug Administration (FDA).

Medical uses 
Empagliflozin is indicated to reduce the risk of cardiovascular death and hospitalization for heart failure in adults with heart failure; to reduce the risk of cardiovascular death in adults with type2 diabetes and established cardiovascular disease; and as an adjunct to diet and exercise to improve glycemic control in adults with type2 diabetes.

Contraindications 
 History of a severe allergic reaction to empagliflozin
 End-stage kidney disease
 Diabetic ketoacidosis

Side effects

Common 
 Empagliflozin increases the risk of genital fungal infections. The risk is highest in people with a prior history of genital fungal infections.
 Urinary tract infections (UTIs) may be more common with empagliflozin. Certain individual clinical trials have demonstrated an increase risk but cumulative data across multiple trials show no increase in UTI risk.
 Empagliflozin reduces systolic and diastolic blood pressure and can increase the risk of low blood pressure, which can cause fainting and/or falls. The risk is higher in older people, people taking diuretics, and people with reduced kidney function.
 Slight increases in Low-density lipoprotein (LDL) cholesterol can be seen with empagliflozin, in the range of 2–4% from baseline.

Serious 
 Diabetic ketoacidosis (DKA), a rare but potentially life-threatening condition, may occur more commonly with empagliflozin and other SGLT-2 inhibitors. While DKA is usually associated with elevated blood glucose levels, in people taking SGLT-2 inhibitors DKA may be seen with uncharacteristically normal blood glucose levels, a phenomenon called euglycemic ketoacidosis. The absence of elevated blood glucose levels in people on an SGLT-2 inhibitor may make it more difficult to diagnose DKA. The risk of empagliflozin-associated DKA may be higher in the setting of illness, dehydration, surgery, and/or alcohol consumption. It is also seen in type1 diabetes who take empagliflozin, which notably is an unapproved or "off-label" use of the medication. To lessen the risk of developing ketoacidosis (a serious condition in which the body produces high levels of blood acids called ketones) after surgery, the FDA has approved changes to the prescribing information for SGLT2 inhibitor diabetes medicines to recommend they be stopped temporarily before scheduled surgery. Empagliflozin should each be stopped at least three days before scheduled surgery. Symptoms of ketoacidosis include nausea, vomiting, abdominal pain, tiredness, and trouble breathing.
 Fournier's gangrene, a rare but serious infection of the groin, occurs more commonly in people taking empagliflozin and other SGLT-2 inhibitors. Symptoms include feverishness, a general sense of malaise, and pain or swelling around the genitals or in the skin behind them. The infection progresses quickly and urgent medical attention is recommended.
 Empagliflozin can increase the risk of low blood sugar when it is used together with a sulfonylurea or insulin. When used by itself or in addition to metformin it does not appear to increase the risk of hypoglycemia.

Mechanism of action 
Empagliflozin is an inhibitor of the sodium glucose co-transporter-2 (SGLT-2), which is found almost exclusively in the proximal tubules of nephronic components in the kidneys. SGLT-2 accounts for about 90percent of glucose reabsorption into the blood. Blocking SGLT-2 reduces blood glucose by blocking glucose reabsorption in the kidney and thereby excreting glucose (i.e., blood sugar) via the urine.

History 
It was developed by Boehringer Ingelheim and Eli Lilly and Company. It is also available as the combinations empagliflozin/linagliptin, empagliflozin/metformin, and empagliflozin/linagliptin/metformin.

For cardiovascular death, the FDA based its decision on a postmarketing study it required when it approved empagliflozin in 2014 as an adjunct to diet and exercise to improve glycemic control in adults with type2 diabetes. Empagliflozin was studied in a postmarket clinical trial of more than 7,000 participants with type2 diabetes and cardiovascular disease. In the trial, empagliflozin was shown to reduce the risk of cardiovascular death compared to a placebo when added to standard of care therapies for diabetes and atherosclerotic cardiovascular disease.

For heart failure, the safety and effectiveness of empagliflozin were evaluated by the FDA as an adjunct to standard of care therapy in a randomized, double-blind, international trial comparing 2,997 participants who received empagliflozin, 10 mg, once daily to 2,991 participants who received the placebo. The main efficacy measurement was the time to death from cardiovascular causes or need to be hospitalized for heart failure. Of the individuals who received empagliflozin for an average of about two years, 14% died from cardiovascular causes or were hospitalized for heart failure, compared to 17% of the participants who received the placebo. This benefit was mostly attributable to fewer participants being hospitalized for heart failure.

The FDA granted the application for empagliflozin priority review and granted the approval of Jardiance to Boehringer Ingelheim.

Legal status
As of May 2013, Boehringer and Lilly had submitted applications for marketing approval to the European Medicines Agency (EMA) and the US Food and Drug Administration (FDA). The drug was approved in the European Union in May 2014, and was approved in the United States in August 2014. The FDA required four postmarketing studies: a cardiovascular outcomes trial, two studies in children, and a toxicity study in animals related to the pediatric trials.

Research 
A single study shows that half a tablet of empagliflozin 25mg has similar glycemic efficacy as a full tablet.

Weight and blood pressure 
Empagliflozin causes moderate reductions in blood pressure and body weight. These effects are likely due to the excretion of glucose in the urine and a slight increase in urinary sodium excretion. In clinical trials, patients taking empagliflozin lost an average of 2% of their baseline body weight. A higher percentage of people taking empagliflozin achieved weight loss greater than 5% from their baseline. The medication reduced systolic blood pressure by 3 to 5millimeters of mercury (mmHg). The effects on blood pressure and body weight are generally viewed as favorable, as many patients with type2 diabetes have high blood pressure or are overweight or obese.

References

External links 
 

Anti-diabetic drugs
Boehringer Ingelheim
Eli Lilly and Company brands
Ethers
Glucosides
Wikipedia medicine articles ready to translate
SGLT2 inhibitors